Harmony at Home ( She Steps Out) is a 1930 pre-Code domestic-comedy film directed by Hamilton MacFadden. It was produced and distributed by Fox Film Corporation. It was based on a 1925 Broadway play, The Family Upstairs by actor, writer, composer Harry Delf.

Cast
Marguerite Churchill as Louise Haller
Rex Bell as Dick Grant
Charlotte Henry as Dora Haller
Charles Eaton as Willie Haller 
Dixie Lee as Rita Joyce
William Collier, Sr. as Joe Haller
Elizabeth Patterson as Emma Haller
Dot Farley as The Modiste

See also
The Family Upstairs (1926)
Stop, Look and Love (1939)

References

External links
 

1930 films
American films based on plays
Films directed by Hamilton MacFadden
Fox Film films
American black-and-white films
1930 comedy films
American comedy films
Remakes of American films
Sound film remakes of silent films
Films scored by Samuel Kaylin
1930s English-language films
1930s American films